The 7th Kentucky Infantry Regiment was an infantry regiment that served in the Confederate States Army during the American Civil War.

Service
The 7th Kentucky Infantry was organized in September 1861, at Camp Burnett near Clinton, Kentucky, under the command of Colonel Charles Wickliffe.

Early in the war, the regiment performed provost guard duty at Paducah, Kentucky. In February 1862, the regiment was assigned to a brigade and moved south to Corinth, Mississippi. At the Battle of Shiloh, the regiment was brigaded with a battalion of the 1st Tennessee Infantry, 6th Tennessee Infantry, 9th Tennessee Infantry, and Smith's Battery (Mississippi). On the second day of the battle, Col. Wickliffe was mortally wounded when the regiment was ordered to reinforce the left flank of their brigade. Brigade commander Brig. Gen. George Maney stated, "I directed Colonel Wickliffe, of the Seventh Kentucky, who rendered me most efficient service by his activity and gallantry, the re-enforce[ment of] our left. He did as directed and received his fatal wound at the head of a charge, doing his whole duty as a devoted patriot and gallant soldier."  Wickliffe died ten days later near Jackson, Tennessee. Wickliffe was a nephew and namesake of Kentucky's 14th governor, Charles A. Wickliffe, a staunch Unionist.

Following Shiloh, the 7th Kentucky Infantry moved south and participated in the Corinth Campaign and the Battle of Baton Rouge. The regiment then remained at Port Hudson, Louisiana, until August 20, 1862, when it and the 3rd Kentucky Infantry and 8th Kentucky Infantry became part of the Army of Tennessee. The 7th Kentucky Infantry were en route to Bragg at Tullahoma, Tennessee, when they were ordered to reinforce Lt. Gen. John C. Pemberton in the defenses of Vicksburg, Mississippi.

By early 1864, the regiment's strength was severely depleted. The 7th Kentucky Infantry was ordered to report to Lt. Gen. Nathan Bedford Forrest. Horses were unavailable, so the men followed Forrest on foot. The Kentucky troops that accompanied Forrest were divided into four brigades. The 7th Kentucky Infantry was in the third brigade with the 3rd Kentucky Infantry, 8th Kentucky Infantry, and 12th Kentucky Infantry, commanded by Colonel A. P. Thompson. On March 15, 1864, Forrest moved north toward Paducah, Kentucky. Three miles from Paducah they encountered Union pickets and pushed them back to their camp on the outskirts of town. Under fire from a nearby fort, the Kentuckians moved through the streets of Paducah. The fort was discovered to be impenetrable, and a retreat was ordered. Col. Thompson was killed by cannon fire while leading his troops. Forrest soon returned to Mississippi where the regiment was engaged at the Battle of Brice's Crossroads. At some point in the campaign to Kentucky, the regiment was mounted, becoming the 7th Kentucky Mounted Infantry.

The regiment surrendered on May 4, 1865, at Columbus, Mississippi.

Commanders
 Colonel Charles Wickliffe - mortally wounded at the battle of Shiloh
 Colonel Edward Crossland

See also

 List of Kentucky Civil War Confederate units
 Kentucky in the Civil War

References
 Carvell, Frank R., Jr. The Kentucky Brave: A Study of the Activities of the 12th Tennessee Infantry, 22nd Tennessee Infantry, 3rd Kentucky Infantry and 7th Kentucky Infantry, 1861-1862 (Paducah, KY: S.B.C. Pub.), 1999.
 George, Henry. History of the 3d, 7th, 8th and 12th Kentucky C.S.A. (Louisville, KY: C. T. Dearing), 1911.
 Thompson, Edwin Porter. History of the First Kentucky Brigade (Cincinnati, OH: Caxton Pub. House), 1868.
 Thompson, Edwin Porter. History of the Orphan Brigade (Louisville, KY: L. N. Thompson), 1898.

External links
 Brief regimental history, biographies, rosters, and letters of the 7th Kentucky Infantry

Military units and formations established in 1861
Military units and formations disestablished in 1865
Units and formations of the Confederate States Army from Kentucky
1861 establishments in Kentucky